Bedstone Court is an imposing 19th-century country house at Bedstone, Shropshire, England. It is occupied by Bedstone College, an independent educational establishment, and is a Grade II listed building.

The red brick and black-and-white timbered house was built between 1882 and 1884, to a design by architect Thomas Harris, for Sir Henry Ripley, a wealthy Yorkshire industrialist and Member of Parliament. The multi-gabled three-storey house has wooden mullioned and transomed windows and is a "calendar house", reputed to have 365 windows, 52 rooms (on the first 2 floors), 12 chimneys and 7 external doors. The central hall has a 52-panelled stained-glass window depicting the months of the year, signs of the zodiac, birds associated with the months and agricultural activities of the months.

The Ripley family sold the house for educational purposes in about 1950. The building was badly damaged by a fire in 1996 but was fully restored and continues to be the centrepiece of Bedstone College.

See also
Listed buildings in Bedstone

References

Grade II listed buildings in Shropshire
Country houses in Shropshire